Mthuthuzeli Gift Khoza, known commonly by his stage name De Mthuda, is a South African record producer and DJ. He is best known for his singles "Shesha Geza" and "John Wick ".

Early life and career
De Mthuda was born in Vosloorus, Johannesburg. He started producing music in 2010 when he was still in High school and eventually dropped out while he was in Grade 11 to his pursue his music career.

In May 2019, he released the single "Shesha Geza". The song was certified gold by RiSA and nominated for Record of the year at the 26th South African Music Awards.

In November 2020, he released the album Ace of Spades. The album was nominated for Amapiano album of the year at the South African Amapiano Awards.

In October 2021, he released the album The Landlord. The album features amapiano musicians Sir Trill, Daliwonga, Kabza De Small, Focalistic, Njelic, Da Muziqal Chef and Malumnator.

Discography
 Ace of Spades (2020)
 The Landlord (2021)

Awards and nominations

References

Living people
Amapiano musicians
South African musicians
South African DJs
People from Johannesburg
Year of birth missing (living people)